Star Hero is a role-playing game, first published by Hero Games in 1989, which uses the Hero System rules to represent the science fiction genre. The original edition was for the Hero System's third edition. A 2002 edition was released based on the system's fifth edition. Though not nearly as popular as its Champions, Dark Champions, and Fantasy Hero lines, the genre book has been received well by fans and critics alike, and its Terran Empire setting has received positive reviews. This book was dedicated to RJM Hughes, an avid poster at the Hero Games forums, who died in August 2002 due to complications from diabetes. A 2011 release was built using the Hero System's sixth edition.

Like Champions, Star Hero requires the Hero System rulebook to play, as the rules are pretty similar to all other games using the system, with minor alterations to facilitate such common science fiction elements as interstellar starship battles, faster-than-light travel, and alien empires.

Hero Universe
The official Hero Universe setting divides the science fiction genre into five historical periods: Solar Hero (years 2080 to 2200), Interstellar Hero (2200–2300), Alien Wars (2300–2400), The Terran Empire (2400–2700), and The Galactic Federation (2700-3000).

Fifth Edition Star Hero supplements
Terran Empire by James Cambias, 2003
The Spacer's Toolkit by Ben Seeman, 2003
Alien Wars by Allen Thomas, 2003
Worlds of Empire by Allen Thomas, Ben Seeman, Jason Walters, Steve Long, and Darren Watts, 2006

Reception
David Rogers reviewed the first edition of Star Hero in Space Gamer Vol. II No. 1. Rogers commented that "Overall, I give Star Hero a B+ for presentation, largely because of artwork and sloppy editing. The game, though, plays like a winner. If you're looking for roleplaying science fiction that allows you design your own characters rather than relying on dice to make up your characters for you, this is your game."

Reviews
Pyramid

References

External links
Star Hero home page at Hero Games

Hero System
Role-playing games introduced in 2002
Space opera role-playing games
Role-playing games introduced in 1989